The Pataua River  is a tidal river of the Northland Region of New Zealand's North Island. It flows northeast from its origins east of Whangarei, reaching the Pacific Ocean at the southern end of Ngunguru Bay. At its mouth, the river is flanked by the settlements of Pataua North and Pataua South, which are connected by a footbridge.

See also
List of rivers of New Zealand

References

Rivers of the Northland Region
Rivers of New Zealand